Central Queensland FC was a football (soccer) club in Rockhampton, Queensland. The club was established in 2012. The club played in the National Premier League Queensland and were removed from the NPL in March 2014 after failing to meet licensing conditions.

External links
 Home Page
 Football Queensland
 Facebook

References

National Premier Leagues clubs
Soccer clubs in Queensland
Association football clubs established in 2012
2012 establishments in Australia
Defunct soccer clubs in Australia